Miha Novak (born 24 March 1987) is a Slovenian football midfielder, who plays for NK Domžale in Slovenian PrvaLiga.

External links 
(link to profile on official website)

Slovenian footballers
Living people
1987 births
Sportspeople from Kranj
Association football midfielders
NK Domžale players